Kristóf Rasovszky (born 27 March 1997) is a Hungarian Olympic swimmer. He represented his country at the 2016 Summer Olympics and 2020 Summer Olympics winning the silver medal in the 10 kilometre open water swim at the 2020 Olympic Games.

Career
Rasovszky competed at the 2016 Summer Olympics. He won the 5 kilometre and the 25 kilometre open water swim in the 2018 European Aquatics Championships. He won the 5 kilometre open water swim in the 2019 World Aquatics Championships.

In 2021, he won the bronze medal in the team relay event at the 2020 European Aquatics Championships held in Budapest, Hungary. Later in the year, at the 2020 Summer Olympics, held in 2021 due to the COVID-19 pandemic and contested in Tokyo, Japan, he won a silver medal in the 10 kilometre open water swim with a time of 1:48:59.0.

At the 2022 European Aquatics Championships, held in August in Rome, Italy, Rasovszky helped achieve a finish in 59:53.9 in the open water mixed team relay, anchoring the relay to a silver medal victory only behind the gold medal-winning team from Italy.

Following a fourth-place finish in the 10 kilometre open water swam at the third leg of the 2022 FINA Marathon Swim World Series, held later the same month as the European Championships at Lake Mégantic in Lac-Mégantic, Canada, Rasovszky ranked first based on his results from the first three legs of the World Series circuit. At the fifth and final leg of the World Series, held three months later in Eilat Israel, he placed fourth in the 10 kilometre open water swim with a time of 1:46:45.40 and tied Gregorio Paltrinieri of Italy for the overall highest-scoring male competitor spot.

References

External links

1997 births
Living people
Hungarian male swimmers
Swimmers at the 2016 Summer Olympics
Olympic swimmers of Hungary
European Aquatics Championships medalists in swimming
People from Veszprém
World Aquatics Championships medalists in open water swimming
Male long-distance swimmers
European Games competitors for Hungary
Swimmers at the 2015 European Games
Swimmers at the 2020 Summer Olympics
Olympic silver medalists for Hungary
Olympic silver medalists in swimming
Medalists at the 2020 Summer Olympics
Sportspeople from Veszprém County